FC Herzogenbuchsee  are a Swiss football team currently playing in Liga 2.,
the fourth tier in the Swiss football pyramid Group 4. The club was formed in 1915.
They finished 2008/2009 season in 4th position .

External links
 http://www.fc-herzogenbuchsee.ch/  

Association football clubs established in 1915
Football clubs in Switzerland
1915 establishments in Switzerland